The 2000 United States presidential election in Delaware took place on November 7, 2000, part of the 2000 United States presidential election in all 50 states and D.C. Voters chose three representatives, or electors to the Electoral College, who voted for president and vice president.

Delaware was won by Vice President Al Gore with a 13.1% margin of victory. Gore carried Delaware's most populous county, New Castle County, with almost 60% of the vote. Bush won the other two counties, but by relatively narrow margins. This was the first election since 1948, and only the fourth since 1892, in which Delaware backed the losing nominee, indicating its transformation from historical bellwether state to reliable blue state. Bush became the first Republican since Benjamin Harrison in 1888 to win a presidential election without New Castle County or Delaware at-large.

Delaware was also 1 of 10 states to back George H. W. Bush in 1988 to have never been won by George W. Bush in either of his runs for the presidency.

Results

By county

Counties that flipped from Democratic to Republican
Kent (Largest city: Dover)
Sussex (Largest city: Seaford)

By congressional district
Due to the state's low population, only 1 congressional district, Delaware's at-large congressional district is allocated.

Electors 

Technically the voters of Delaware cast their ballots for electors: representatives to the Electoral College. Delaware is allocated 3 electors because it has 1 congressional district and 2 senators. All candidates who appear on the ballot or qualify to receive write-in votes must submit a list of 3 electors, who pledge to vote for their candidate and his or her running mate. Whoever wins the majority of votes in the state is awarded all 3 electoral votes. Their chosen electors then vote for president and vice president. Although electors are pledged to their candidate and running mate, they are not obligated to vote for them. An elector who votes for someone other than his or her candidate is known as a faithless elector.

The electors of each state and the District of Columbia met on December 18, 2000 to cast their votes for president and vice president. The Electoral College itself never meets as one body. Instead the electors from each state and the District of Columbia met in their respective capitols.

The following were the members of the Electoral College from the state. All were pledged to and voted for Gore and Lieberman:
Michael Begatto
Margaret Rose Henry
Ruth Ann Messick

See also
 United States presidential elections in Delaware

References

2000
Delaware
2000 Delaware elections